Les Astres FC de Douala is a Cameroonian professional football club based in Douala. It is a member of the Cameroonian Football Federation.

Honours
 Cameroon Première Division:
Runners-up: 2009–10, 2010–11, 2013
 Cameroon Cup:
Runners-up: 2007, 2009, 2010

Performance in CAF competitions
CAF Champions League: 3 appearances
2011 – Preliminary Round
2012 – Preliminary Round
2014 – First Round

CAF Confederation Cup: 3 appearances
2006 – First Round
2007 – Group stage/Semi-finals
2008 – Second Round of 16

Current squad
As of 17 June 2019.

References

External links
Team profile – soccerway.com

Astres FC
Sport in Douala
2002 establishments in Cameroon
Sports clubs in Cameroon
Association football clubs established in 2002